These are the results from the synchronised swimming competition at the 1982 World Aquatics Championships.

Medal table

Medal summary

 
1982 in synchronized swimming
Synchronised swimming
Synchronised swimming at the World Aquatics Championships
Synchronised swimming in Ecuador